Lake Success is a lake near Porterville, California on the Tule River at . Its construction was completed in 1961. The project's primary purpose is flood control, but the lake also provides water for irrigation and recreation. California State Route 190 also crosses the lake's only bridge.

History 
An entire cemetery was moved to allow the creation of Success Lake. Luck was with the construction company as it was one of those years that we did not have much rain, and when they made the final fill on the dam, the Tule River was only about four feet wide. Lost in the construction of the dam was Bartlett Park and Porterville Beach. Families also lost their places, including the Wilcox family, Lewis family, Templeton family and the Kaufman family. Kincaid Cover is still called by the family name and is a site of many Indian artifacts that are in the process of being preserved. On the Wilcox Ranch was the Wilcox cemetery, which had to be moved to the Home of Peace Cemetery at the Porterville Cemetery, where they rest today. Some of the dates of the burials were as far back as 1859. Louis Stephens was in charge of the moving of the graves. Sardis Templeton was present and wanted the $20 gold pieces that were supposed to have covered the eyes of Origin Wilcox. However, the $20 gold pieces had turned into 50-cent pieces, and they let Sardis keep them. At one time Sardis was the editor of the Porterville Recorder when Homer Wood was the owner and publisher.

Success Lake faced an uncertain future in 1999 when surveys indicated that Success Dam might fail in an earthquake. The lake level was drawn down to 28,000-acre-feet in 2004, contributing to the loss of the marina and seriously interfering with water recreation. Later study proved those fears to be unfounded, and the reservoir has since been refilled to 65,000* acre feet. The public is slowly starting to realize that Lake Success is back in all its glory.

Lake Success U.S. Army Corps of Engineers held their first annual National CleanUp Day event with volunteers and staff on September 18, 2021. In addition to cleaning up, students from local schools planted trees.

Wildlife 
A 1,499-acre wildlife refuge protects a portion of the northwest shoreline and is considered to be one of the best bird-watching sites in Tulare County. American pelicans and Canada geese are often seen on the lake, while mallards, grebes and coots shelter closer to the shore. Bald eagles soar over the lake, while migratory shorebirds wade in the shallows. Wetlands along the shoreline provide habitat for herons, egrets and kingfishers. The surrounding grasslands and pothole ponds are a fine place to view blacktail deer, California quail, cottontails and jackrabbits. Some areas are open for hunting in season. Trails make access to the wildlife area easy for hikers and add considerably to the natural experience.

In fiction

In the science fiction novel Lucifer's Hammer, written by Larry Niven and Jerry Pournelle, fragments of a comet strike the Earth, causing massive tidal waves to destroy most of the planet's coastal cities.  Los Angeles is completely destroyed, and the collapse of dams throughout California causes the San Joaquin Valley to become an inland sea.  The collapse of Success Dam is witnessed by two of the characters.  After the disasters subside, an enclave of civilization forms in the fictional "Silver Valley", located slightly east or northeast of Springville, just north of the Middle Fork of the Tule River.

Lake Recreation 
Boating is a favorite activity at Lake Success. All types of watercraft are allowed, so on hot summer weekends the waters are a beehive of activity with water skiers, jet-skiers, power-boaters and sailboats sharing space with fishing boats, canoes and kayaks. A 5 mph boat speed limit is imposed from dusk to dawn, and water skiing and jet-skiing are forbidden during those hours. The quiet waters of the many coves along the irregular shoreline make canoeing and kayaking especially popular. The lake is considered one of the best lakes in the Valley for large mouth bass, and tournaments are often held here. The bass aren't usually lunkers but are plentiful. In addition, bluegills, crappie, channel catfish and occasional trout are caught. A floating marina is also available on Success Lake; Success Lake Marina.  The lake has since been refilled as the dam has passed all inspections

Rocky Hill Campground offers only non-electric sites, but has another boat launch ramp and a picnic area. Day-use Bartlett Park has picnic shelters and a playground. All three sites provide a lovely view of the lake against a backdrop of the Sierra Nevada foothills. There are no designated beach areas, but informal swim areas are located nearby.

There is no real estate available directly along the shoreline, although some properties overlook the lake and its buffer zone of public property. Real estate can be found away from the lake, and plenty of alternative lodgings are available in the area, from motels to cabins, bed-and-breakfasts and private rentals.

Marina 
The original Success Marina was conceived and built in the early 1960s by Gerald and Della (née Bearce) Weaver of Tulare.  The marina, which began as a small trailer on the eastern shore selling sodas, candy and cigarettes, quickly evolved into a modern, for the times, circular floating marina with bait and tackle shop, gas dock, walk up fast food window, and sleeping quarters.  Mr. Weaver held licenses to build and sell Glaspar fishing and ski boats, and Mercury outboard engines.  Boat and engine service were available as well. Also present was dock space, which became expansive, slips and boats for rent, a live bait pen, and plenty of area for houseboat moorage. The U.S. Army Corps of Engineers temporarily lowered the amount of water in the lake between 2012 and 2014 while tests were conducted regarding seismic faults near the dam. Those pool restrictions have since been eased.

Success Lake Marina 

The new Success Lake Marina was established in 2015 and is currently open throughout the year but gains popularity during the hot summer months(June–August). The marina has grown in past years to now include multiple private docks for private boat slip rental and weekend slip rental or storage, a store that offers cold drinks, snacks, ice, beer, wine, toys, tackle, live bait and much more. There is plenty of opportunities to get out on the water with some of the rentals offered: 10-20 person patio boats, 20 person patio boats with slides, fishing boats, kayaks, SUPs(stand up paddle boards), and water bikes.

See also
List of dams and reservoirs in California
List of lakes in California

External links
U.S. Army Corps of Engineers - Success Lake

References

Success, Lake
Geography of the San Joaquin Valley
Success, Lake
Success